This list includes the major honours won by JS Saoura and all-time statistics and records set by the club, its players and its coaches. The players section includes the club's top goalscorers and those who have made most appearances in first-team competitive matches. It also displays international achievements by players representing JS Saoura, and the highest transfer fees paid and received by the club.

Players

Appearances 
Most appearances: Mohamed El Amine Hammia – 219 (2014–present);
Most appearances in a season: Belaid Hamidi (2021–22) – 43;
Most league appearances: Mohamed El Amine Hammia – 188 (2014–present);
Most Algerian Cup appearances: Nabil Bousmaha – 10 (2012–18);
Most african Cup appearances: Mohamed El Amine Hammia – 20 (2014–present);
Most league appearances by a non-Algerian player: Jean-Jules Bapidi – 88 (2014–2018);
Youngest debutant: 
Youngest starter in the league: 
Youngest league debutant: Islam Ben Yezli – 17 years, 10 months and 16 days (against NC Magra, 2020–21 Algerian Ligue Professionnelle 1, 30 May 2021);
Youngest debutant in the African Cup / CAF Champions League: Messala Merbah – 22 years, 6 months and 18 days (against Enugu Rangers, 2017 CAF Champions League preliminary round, first leg, 10 February 2017);
Youngest captain in the African Cup / CAF Champions League: 
Youngest debutant in a CAF competition: Marwane Khelif – 21 years, 8 months and 8 days (against ASAC Concorde, 2021–22 CAF Confederation Cup Second round, first leg, 16 October 2021);

Most appearances 
Competitive matches only, includes appearances as used substitute. Numbers in brackets indicate goals scored.{{refn|group=note|name=appearances|The statistics of all the games except 2019–20 Arab Club Champions Cup Preliminary round.Statistics correct as of game against RC Arbaâ on June 11, 2022.}}

1 Includes the Super Cup, League Cup and UAFA Club Cup.
2 Includes the Confederation Cup and Champions League.

 Goalscorers 
Most goals: 35 – Moustapha Djallit;
Most league goals: 34 – Moustapha Djallit;
Most goals in international club competitions: 5 – Mohamed El Amine Hammia;
Most goals in international club competitions in a season: 4 – Aimen Lahmeri;
Youngest league scorer: Islam Ben Yezli – 18 years and 6 months (4–1 against Paradou AC, 2021–22 Algerian Ligue Professionnelle 1, 16 January 2022).
Youngest hat-trick scorer: Billel Messaoudi – 22 years, 4 months and 2 days (5–0 against Volcan Club, 2019–20 Arab Club Champions Cup, 19 August 2019).

 Top goalscorers in all competitions Matches played (including as used substitute) appear in brackets.

1 Includes the Super Cup, League Cup and UAFA Club Cup.
2 Includes the Confederation Cup and Champions League.

 Top goalscorers in international club competitions Matches played (including as substitute) appear in brackets''.

Transfers

Management

Coaches 
Most matches: 54 – Karim Khouda;
Most matches in international club competitions:

Club

Matches 
Most official matches in a season: 44 (2021–22);
Best league start:

Firsts 
First match: 
First Ligue 1 match: JS Saoura 0–1 CR Belouizdad (2012–13 Algerian Ligue Professionnelle 1, 15 September 2012);
First Algerian Cup match: 
First League Cup match: JS Saoura 4–0 JSM Skikda (2020–21 Algerian League Cup, 8 May 2021);
First match in international club competitions: JS Saoura 1–1 Enugu Rangers (2017 CAF Champions League, 10 February 2017);

Wins 
Biggest win: 
Biggest Algerian Cup win: 
Biggest Ligue 1 win: 
Biggest win in international club competitions: 4–0 (against Hearts of Oak, 2021–22 CAF Confederation Cup playoffs round, 5 December 2021);
Most wins in a season: 22 (2021–22);
Most consecutive league wins in a season: 6 in 30 matches (2017–18);
Fewest wins in the league in a season: 9 (2019–20 Algerian Ligue Professionnelle 1);
Most consecutive away league wins in a season: 
Most international club competition wins in a season: 5 in 10 matches (2021–22 CAF Confederation Cup);
Most consecutive international club competition wins in a season:

Defeats 
Biggest defeat: 
Biggest Algerian Cup defeat: 
Biggest Ligue 1 defeat: 
Biggest defeat in international club competitions: 
Most defeats in the league in a season: 12 (2012–13 Algerian Ligue Professionnelle 1);
Fewest defeats in the league in a season: 6 (2015–16 Algerian Ligue Professionnelle 1);
Most consecutive home matches without defeats: 58 (from 6 February 2015 to 1 September 2018);
Most consecutive home matches without defeats in the league: 53 (from 6 February 2015 to 1 September 2018);
Most consecutive matches without defeats in the league:

Goals 
First goal in international club competitions: (against Enugu Rangers, 2017 CAF Champions League, preliminary round, 10 February 2017);
Most league goals scored in a season: 60 (in 38 matches, 2020–21 Algerian Ligue Professionnelle 1);
Fewest league goals scored in a season: 19 (in 22 matches, 2019–20 Algerian Ligue Professionnelle 1);
Most league goals conceded in a season: 36 (in 30 matches, 2013–14 Algerian Ligue Professionnelle 1);
Fewest league goals conceded in a season: 18 (in 22 matches, 2019–20 Algerian Ligue Professionnelle 1);
Most international club competition goals scored in a season: 13 (in 10 matches, 2021–22 CAF Confederation Cup);
Most league minutes without conceding goals: 
Most consecutive league matches scoring goals: 9 (15 January –12 March 2021);

Points 
Most points in a season: 69 (in 38 matches, 2020–21 Algerian Ligue Professionnelle 1);
Fewest points in a season: 33 (in 22 matches, 2019–20 Algerian Ligue Professionnelle 1);

See also 
JS Saoura in international club football

Notes

References 

JS Saoura
Algerian football club records and statistics